Júnia Ferreira Furtado (Belo Horizonte, 1960) is a Brazilian historian and university professor. She retired from the Universidade Federal de Minas Gerais (UFMG) in 2016.

Education 
After graduating in 1983 with a degree in History from the Universidade Federal de Minas Gerais, Júnia Furtado completed a specialization in Modern and Contemporary History from the Pontifícia Universidade Católica de Minas Gerais.  She then completed a Master's degree in Social History from the Universidade de São Paulo (1991), where she went on to defend her doctoral degree in 1996.

In 2000, Júnia Furtado completed a post-doctorate at Princeton University. In 2008 and 2009, she completed another post-doctorate at the École des hautes études en sciences sociales.

In 2003, Furtado published her best-known work Chica da Silva e o contratador de diamantes, (English: Chica da Silva: A Brazilian Slave of the Eighteenth Century).

She has been a professor at the UFMG since 1992, and at the Universidade de Lisboa since 2005.

Books 
 Memória sobre a capitania das Minas Gerais: seu território, clima e produções metálicas (edição crítica do livro de José Vieira Couto), 1994
 O Livro da Capa Verde: o regimento diamantino de 1771 e a vida no distrito Diamantino no período da Real Extração, 1996
 Chica da Silva: A Brazilian Slave of the Eighteenth Century (New York: Cambridge University Press, 2009).
 Índice do Inventário dos Manuscritos Avulsos relativos a Minas Gerais existentes no Arquivo Ultramarino (Lisboa), 1998
 Homens de negócio: a interiorização da metrópole e do comércio nas Minas setecentistas, 1999
 Cultura e Sociedade no Brasil Colônia, 2000
 Diálogos Oceânicos: Minas Gerais e as novas abordagens para uma história do Império Ultramarino português (organizadora), 2001
 Cartografia das Minas Gerais: da Capitania à Província, 2002
 Erário Mineral de Luís Gomes Ferreira (organizadora), 2002
 Chica da Silva e o contratador dos diamantes: o outro lado do mito, 2003
 Cartografia da Conquista do Território das Minas, 2004
 Trabalho livre, trabalho escravo Brasil e Europa, séculos XVIII e XIX (organizadora), 2006
 Odontologia: história restaurada, 2007
 Sons, formas, cores e movimentos na modernidade atlântica: Europa, Américas e África (organizadora), 2008
 O governo dos povos, 2009

Awards 
 Honorable mention for the 2004 Casa de las Américas Prize for her book about Chica da Silva.
 Honorable mention (2004) for the Prêmio Érico Vanucci Mendes, awarded by the CNPq

References 

20th-century Brazilian historians
1960 births
Living people
21st-century Brazilian historians
Academic staff of the Federal University of Minas Gerais